The Canoe Association of Northern Ireland (CANI) was formed in 1964  and is the governing body for canoeing and kayaking in Northern Ireland.  CANI is the Northern Ireland Division of British Canoeing.  British Canoeing is the governing body for the UK.  CANI, through British Canoeing is affiliated to the International Canoe Federation.

It covers all branches of the sport from recreational activities to whitewater racing, slalom racing; flatwater sprint and marathon racing; canoe polo; and surf kayaking.

CANI has some 1500 individual members of whom about 400 are coaches.  There are also 250 affiliated members, these are paddlers who are members of affiliated clubs.  Currently 22 clubs  and organisations are affiliated to CANI.

External links
 CANI official website
 Official Website of the British Canoe Union
 Canoe Foundation - Official Charity Partner of the BCU and Home Nation Associations

References

Sports organizations established in 1964
Canoeing
Canoe organizations
Organisations based in Belfast
Canoeing in the United Kingdom